"Locked Out" is a song by rock group Crowded House from their fourth studio album, Together Alone (1993). It was released as a single in February 1994 and was also included on the soundtrack to the American film Reality Bites. In the United Kingdom, it was the most successful single from Together Alone, reaching  12. The single fared less well in Australia, where it peaked at No. 79 in June 1994. The cover artwork features the four members of Crowded House in a mirror image, including Mark Hart.

Track listings
Australian and US single

Live tracks were recorded at The Town & Country Club, London, 9 November 1991.
 "Locked Out" – 3:18
 "World Where You Live" (live)
 "It's Only Natural" (live)
 "Weather with You" (live)

UK cassette single

Live track were recorded at the Hammersmith Apollo, England, 12 November 1993.
 "Locked Out" – 3:18
 "Distant Sun" (live) – 4:19

UK CD single

"Distant Sun" and "Sister Madly" were recorded at the Hammersmith Apollo, England on 12 November 1993; "Hole in the River" was recorded live at the Hammersmith Apollo on 13 November 1993. "Sister Madly" was performance is incomplete.
 "Locked Out" – 3:19
 "Distant Sun" (live) – 4:19
 "Hole in the River" (live) – 7:41
 "Sister Madly" (live) – 2:56

Alternate UK CD single

"Private Universe" and "Fall at Your feet" were recorded at the Hammersmith Apollo, England, 12 November 1993; "Better Be Home Soon" was recorded live at the Hammersmith Apollo on 14 November 1993.
 "Locked Out" – 3:17
 "Private Universe" (live) – 5:01
 "Fall at Your Feet" (live) – 4:01
 "Better Be Home Soon" (live) – 3:39

UK 12-inch vinyl release

Live tracks were recorded at the Hammersmith Apollo, England, 12 November 1993.
 "Locked Out" – 3:19
 "Distant Sun" (live) – 4:19
 "Fall at Your Feet" (live) – 4:01
 "Private Universe" (live) – 5:01

Charts

References

Crowded House songs
1993 songs
1994 singles
Capitol Records singles
Songs written by Neil Finn